The Amalia Lacroze de Fortabat Art Collection is a museum of fine arts in Buenos Aires, Argentina.

Overview
The museum was initiated by María Amalia Lacroze de Fortabat, the longtime chairperson and chief stockholder of Loma Negra, the largest cement manufacturer in Argentina. She set aside a significant portion of her extensive art collection for the purpose, and her foundation contracted internationally acclaimed, Uruguayan born architect Rafael Viñoly for its design.

Built overlooking the northernmost dock in the Puerto Madero district, among its highlights include a roof with a system of mobile aluminum awnings that open and close with the sun's position. Mrs. Fortabat specifically requested this last design feature, remarking that "I've always wanted to look at pictures and the stars at the same time."

The museum was inaugurated on October 22, 2008, and includes two exhibition halls, a library, an auditorium, offices and a cafe-restaurant overlooking the renovated Puerto Madero docklands. Its two exhibition halls house a collection of 230 works (at the opening date) and are divided into seven galleries:

 The Family Gallery: featuring portraits of the Fortabat family.
 Landscapes, the City and Tradition: consisting mostly of 19th century Argentine landscape, naturalist and naïf art by Fernando Fader, Martín Malharro and Prilidiano Pueyrredón and Benito Quinquela Martín, among others.
 International Art:  including works by Pieter Brueghel II, Marc Chagall, Salvador Dalí, Gustav Klimt, Auguste Rodin, Roberto Matta, Jacques Witjens and, among others, Andy Warhol, who created one of his iconic portraits for the patroness. This section also includes one of the few oil paintings from J.M.W. Turner (artist) remaining in private hands, undoubtlessly the highlight of the collection, the wonderful Juliet and her nurse
 Modern Art: Displaying mainly 20th century Argentine works, such as those by Juan Del Prete, Raquel Forner, Emilio Pettoruti, Lino Enea Spilimbergo, Xul Solar and Juan Carlos Castagnino.
 Figurations, Halls I and II: set aside for Figurative art works, such as those by Roberto Aizenberg, Antonio Seguí and Clorindo Testa.
 Antonio Berni Gallery: devoted to the noted Argentine painter and muralist.

Gallery

References

External links
Fortabat Art Collection
 Colección de Arte Amalia Lacroze de Fortabat at Google Cultural Institute

Art museums and galleries in Argentina
Museums in Buenos Aires
Art museums established in 2008
Infrastructure completed in 2008
Rafael Viñoly buildings
2008 establishments in Argentina